Spire Sports + Entertainment (SS+E) is an American talent management agency, motorsports consultant and sports ownership firm founded in 2010. SS+E represents drivers, sponsors and teams in NASCAR, IndyCar, and their respective development ladders, as well as music artists. SSE also owns a part of ECHL teams Rapid City Rush and Greenville Swamp Rabbits.

On December 4, 2018 it was announced that SS+E had purchased a charter in order to enter the NASCAR Cup Series and form its own race team, Spire Motorsports. The team currently fields the No. 7 Chevrolet Camaro ZL1 for Corey LaJoie and the No. 77 Chevrolet Camaro ZL1 for Ty Dillon.

Agency
Spire Sports + Entertainment have clients including James Hinchcliffe, Landon Cassill, Ross Chastain, Todd Gilliland, Justin Haley, Garrett Smithley, Vinnie Miller, Travis Braden, and Cole Rouse. They also have served as official consultants for various sponsors and teams including Hendrick Motorsports, Chip Ganassi Racing, GMS Racing, ThorSport Racing, Larson Marks Racing, 5-hour Energy, Eneos and DC Solar, as well as for Knoxville Raceway.

Legal issues
It was announced on June 28, 2018 that former client Brennan Poole would sue Chip Ganassi Racing and Spire Sports + Entertainment for breach of contract, alleging that CGR and Spire conspired to take away DC Solar's personal sponsorship from Poole and move it to the No. 42 CGR Cup Series team and that Spire's involvement representing both driver and team constituted a conflict of interest. Ganassi and Spire both released statements through attorneys denying the claims, with CGR's statement saying the sponsorship of Poole ended "because he never won a race despite the advantages of the best equipment in the garage."

Spire Motorsports

References

External links
 

Consulting firms of the United States
Entertainment companies established in 2010
Consulting firms established in 2010
Talent agencies
Sports management companies
Companies based in North Carolina
2010 establishments in North Carolina